This article presents lists of the literary events and publications in 1767.

Events
January 29 – The former watchmaker and entrepreneur Pierre Beaumarchais has his first full-length drama, Eugénie, premièred at the Comédie-Française. Revised in two days, it establishes his reputation in this field.
February – King George III of Great Britain requests an introduction to Samuel Johnson from his librarian, Frederick Augusta Barnard. They meet in the library of the Queen's House.
April 24 – First professional performance of a play by an American, The Prince of Parthia by Thomas Godfrey (died 1763), at the new Southwark Theatre in Philadelphia with Lewis Hallam Jr. in a leading rôle.
December 7 – John Street Theatre (Manhattan), the first permanent theater in New York City, is opened by David Douglass with a performance of The Beaux' Stratagem.
Construction of Teatro Real Coliseo de Carlos III de Aranjuez, the first enclosed theatre in Spain, begins. 
Richard Price's volume of sermons, Four Dissertations, is published by Andrew Millar and Thomas Cadell in London, and he joins the "Bowood circle", a group of liberal intellectuals around William Petty, 2nd Earl of Shelburne, at Bowood House in Wiltshire (England) and corresponds with Benjamin Franklin.
Publication of the Epistles and Book of Revelation in Manx as Sceeuyn Paul yn Ostyl gys ny Romanee completes the first translation of the New Testament into that language.
Publication of the first secular prose book in any of the Sorbian languages by Jurij Mjeń.

New books

Fiction
James Boswell – Dorando
Phebe Gibbes – The Woman of Fashion
Hugh Kelly – Memoirs of a Magdalen
Susannah Minifie – Barford Abbey
Frances Sheridan
Continuation of the Memoirs of Miss Sidney Bidulph (posthumous)
The History of Nourjahad
Laurence Sterne – The Life and Opinions of Tristram Shandy, Gentleman vol. ix
Unca Eliza Winkfield (pseudonym) – The Female American
Arthur Young – The Adventures of Emmera

Drama
Pierre Beaumarchais – Eugénie
Richard Bentley – Philodamus
Isaac Bickerstaffe – Lace in the City
George Colman the Elder
The English Merchant
The Oxonian in Town
David Garrick – Cymon
 Hall Hartson – The Countess of Salisbury
Thomas Hull – The Perplexities
William Kenrick – The Widowed Wife
Gotthold Ephraim Lessing – Minna von Barnhelm
Arthur Murphy – The School for Guardians

Poetry

Michael Bruce – Elegy Written in Spring
Francis Fawkes – Partridge-Shooting
Oliver Goldsmith, ed. – The Beauties of English Poesy
Richard Jago – Edge-Hill
Henry Jones – Kew Garden
Christopher Smart (translation) – The Works of Horace, Translated into Verse

Non-fiction
John Byrom – The Universal English Short-hand
William Duff – An Essay on Original Genius
Richard Farmer – An Essay on the Learning of Shakespeare
Adam Ferguson – An Essay on the History of Civil Society
Baron d'Holbach, Paul Henry Thiry  – Christianisme dévoilé
Catharine Macaulay – Loose Remarks on Mr. Hobbes's Philosophical Rudiments of Government and Society (on Hobbes's 1651 work)
Moses Mendelssohn – Phädon
Joseph Priestley – The History and Present State of Electricity
William Warburton – Sermons and Discourses
Arthur Young – The Farmer's Letters to the People of England

Births
January 1 – Maria Edgeworth, Anglo-Irish novelist (died 1849)
February 4 – Andrew Marschalk, American printer (died 1838)
February 6 – Saul Ascher, German political writer and translator (died 1822)
March 1 – Alexander Balfour, Scottish novelist, short-story writer and poet (died 1829)
April 9 – Joseph Fiévée, French journalist, essayist, novelist and dramatist (died 1839)
April 24 – Dorothy Ripley, English missionary and reformist writer (died 1832)
September 6 – Thomas Bayly Howell, English legal writer (died 1815)
September 8 – August Wilhelm Schlegel, German poet and translator (died 1845)
September 10 – Melchiorre Gioia, Italian philosophical writer (died 1829)
October 25 – Benjamin Constant, Swiss-French novelist (died 1830)
November 26 (bapt.) – Elizabeth Bentley, English poet (died 1839)
December 8 – Antoine Fabre d'Olivet, French poet and composer (died 1825)

Deaths
February 16 – David Erskine Baker, English writer on drama and translator (born 1730) 
February 28 – Charles Balguy, English translator and medical writer (born 1708)
April 27 – Johann Gottlob Carpzov, German Biblical scholar (born 1679)
July 15 – Michael Bruce, Scottish poet and hymnist (born 1746)
July 26 – Paul Gottlieb Werlhof, German poet and physician (born 1699)
August 21 – Thomas Osborne, English publisher and bookseller (born 1704)
September 11 – Theophilus Evans, Welsh historian and cleric (born 1693)
October 1 – Léon Ménard, French historical writer and lawyer (born 1706)
December 22 – John Newbery, English children's author and publisher (born 1713)

References

 
Years of the 18th century in literature